Auburndale High School is a four-year public high school located in Auburndale, Florida, United States, and a part of Polk County Public Schools. The school serves about 1,600 students from ninth through twelfth grades. In 2012, construction was completed on a new media center, added parking, centrally-located cafeteria, and new academic buildings.

History

Auburndale’s first official school opened in 1890 in a building on the corner of Main Street and Bridgers Avenue. Education for grades one through eight was offered, and less than 40 students were enrolled in the school. By 1895 the city had the southernmost library and free reading room in the United States, adding culture to the city.

The first building officially constructed as a classroom was built in 1915 on the site that is now Stambaugh Middle School. A second building, built in 1925, included the addition of an auditorium that was used by the city for cultural events until 1979. All Auburndale students in grades one through twelve attended this school until 1947 when Auburndale Central Elementary opened and took the youngest students. In 1954, the school became a junior high school as students in grades nine through twelve moved to the present-day site of Auburndale High School. In 1972, Auburndale Junior High moved and opened just north of the high school and remained until 1984 when Stambaugh Middle School opened. The Auburndale Junior High (North Campus) building was added to the high school campus in the start of the 1989-1990 school year; AHS has been a 9-12 center since.

By the 2012-2013 school year, construction was completed that replaced nearly all of the original campus buildings.

Academics and students

The minority rate at one point was 37%. The school operates on a mixed block schedule with three days per week of 7 period day, and two days with block scheduling. Graduations are held on the football field on campus yearly. At one point, the free or reduced lunch rate was 49%.

Auburndale High School offers several Advanced Placement courses, such as World History, American History, Composition, Literature, Capstone Seminar, Capstone Research, Calculus AB, Statistics, Biology, Environmental Science, Photography, and 3D Art and Design.

Auburndale has partnered with nearby Polk State College and Southeastern University to offer Dual enrollment courses; presently the school offers College Success, Comp 1, Financial Accounting and Humanities, among others.

Notable alumni

 Derwin James- professional football player (attended but did not graduate)
 Bobby Braddock - songwriter/producer
 Chauncey Davis - professional football player
 Les Dudek - guitarist with the Allman Brothers Band
 Van Green - NFL player
 Manisha Singh, attorney and Assistant Secretary of State for Economic and Business Affairs
 Hesham Ismail - professional football player
 Glenn Martinez - professional football player
 Tracy McGrady - professional basketball player (1997) (attended but did not graduate)
 Kyle Ryan - professional baseball player (2010)

References

External links
 Auburndale High School Homepage
 Polk County School District

High schools in Polk County, Florida
School buildings completed in 1953
Public high schools in Florida
Auburndale, Florida
1915 establishments in Florida
Educational institutions established in 1915